Butler Run is a stream located entirely within Delaware County, Ohio.

Butler Run was named for one Mr. Butler, a pioneer who settled near its banks in 1807.

See also
List of rivers of Ohio

References

Rivers of Delaware County, Ohio
Rivers of Ohio